Radical 96 or radical jade meaning "jade" is one of the 23 Kangxi radicals (214 radicals in total) composed of 5 strokes.

When appearing at the left side of a Chinese character, the radical transforms into  consisting of four strokes.

In the Kangxi Dictionary, there are 473 characters (out of 49,030) to be found under this radical.

The variant form of this radical, is used as the 61st indexing component in the Table of Indexing Chinese Character Components predominantly adopted by Simplified Chinese dictionaries published in mainland China, while its original form , along with the left component variant , are listed as its associated indexing components.

Evolution

玉 (jade)

王 (king)

Derived characters

Literature

External links

Unihan Database - U+7389

096
061